Quiavicuzas Zapotec (Northeastern Yautepec Zapotec, Zapoteco de San Juan Lachixila) is a Zapotecan language of the isthmus of Mexico.

References

Zapotec languages